Andre Trevor Ware (born July 31, 1968) is an American sports analyst and commentator and a former American football player. He was the 1989 Heisman Trophy and Davey O'Brien Award winner as a quarterback for the University of Houston. He was the first Black American quarterback to receive the Heisman. In the 1990 NFL Draft, Ware was the first round selection (#7 overall) of the Detroit Lions. He was inducted into the College Football Hall of Fame in 2004.

College career

Ware grew up in the Galveston, Texas region, hoping to play football at the University of Texas. He said "I was going to Texas. All they had to do was lie to me and tell me I was going to play quarterback once I got there. Thank goodness they told me the truth [that] they were going to move me to defense". After graduating from Dickinson High School, Ware instead played at the University of Houston, where he won the Heisman Trophy in 1989, along with the Davey O'Brien Award, the latter award given to the most outstanding college quarterback of the year. That season - his junior year - averaging 52 passes per contest, he threw for 4,699 yards (427.18 yds/g or 127 yds/quarter), 46 touchdowns, and set 26 NCAA records over the span of 11 games, seven of which he sat during the fourth quarter. Many of the records (including the notable 340 yards/5 TDs in the first quarter and 517 yards/6 TDs thrown in one half, set on October 21, 1989) were thanks to the innovative use of the run and shoot offense, which his successor, David Klingler, also used to great effect.  The Cougars ended the season 9-2 and ranked the #14 team in the nation by the Associated Press, but were on probation, making Ware the only quarterback to win the Heisman while playing for a team on probation. He then declared for the NFL Draft, foregoing his senior year.

Professional football career
Ware became the top draft pick of the Detroit Lions when head coach Wayne Fontes overrode the advice of the team's scouting director, who resigned the next day.  Ware joined the Lions for the 1990 season, teaming with the previous Heisman Trophy winner from 1988, Barry Sanders. Ware spent four years with Detroit, playing 14 games and starting six: Coach Fontes insisted on starting the oft-injured Rodney Peete, and usually replacing Peete with Erik Kramer when Peete was hurt or played poorly. Fontes generally only played Ware when the Lions were out of the playoffs or already losing a game by a wide margin. Ware's best stretch came late in the 1992 season when the Lions were out of the playoffs: he won two of three games. He began 1994 on the roster of the Los Angeles Raiders, but was released after several games.  In 1995, he was signed by the Jacksonville Jaguars, one of the NFL's two expansion teams that year.  As a former Heisman Trophy winner, Ware's presence gathered much local excitement in Jacksonville, but ultimately, Ware was cut from the team the week before the regular season began.

It is debated why Ware failed in the NFL despite a prolific college career. While some have argued that Ware's coaches never gave him a fair chance to develop, others have noticed that he was unable to adapt to an offensive system other than the run-and-shoot offense at Houston.

Ware also played in the Canadian Football League with the Ottawa Rough Riders, the BC Lions and the Toronto Argonauts (where he backed up fellow Heisman winner Doug Flutie).  He spent five games with the Berlin Thunder, a German NFL Europe team.

Broadcaster
Since 2002, Ware has been a part of the Houston Texans' radio broadcast team with Marc Vandermeer.

Since 2003, Ware has been a college football analyst for ESPN. From 2003 until 2008, he called games on ESPN, ESPN2 and ESPN on ABC. In July 2009, ESPN announced that Ware would team up with long-time SEC broadcaster Dave Neal in the fall of 2009 as color commentator for ESPN Regional Television's coverage of Southeastern Conference Football. Ware continued in this role until 2013. From 2014 through 2019, he called games for ESPN's SEC Network, then joined the ESPN College Football Friday Primetime team in 2020.

Honors

In 2004, Ware was inducted into the College Football Hall of Fame. On February 29, 2012, he was inducted into the Texas Sports Hall of Fame. Other members of his class include Texas A&M University Women's basketball Coach Gary Blair, Shawn Andaya, University of Texas Football Coach Mack Brown, Fred Couples, Coach Lovie Smith, G. A. Moore, Bubba Smith, Dave Parks, and Tobin Rote.

See also
 1989 Houston Cougars football team
 List of NCAA major college football yearly passing leaders
 List of NCAA major college football yearly total offense leaders
 Racial issues faced by black quarterbacks
 List of black quarterbacks

References

External links

 
 
 

1968 births
Living people
African-American players of American football
African-American players of Canadian football
All-American college football players
American football quarterbacks
Players of American football from Texas
Houston Cougars football players
Detroit Lions players
Los Angeles Raiders players
Jacksonville Jaguars players
Ottawa Rough Riders players
BC Lions players
Toronto Argonauts players
Berlin Thunder players
Canadian football quarterbacks
College football announcers
College Football Hall of Fame inductees
Heisman Trophy winners
Houston Texans announcers
National Football League announcers
Sportspeople from Galveston, Texas
21st-century African-American people
20th-century African-American sportspeople